Calliandra parvifolia is a species of flowering plants of the genus Calliandra in the family Fabaceae.

References

parvifolia
Taxa named by Carlo Luigi Spegazzini